This is a list of drama films of the 1970s.

1970
 The American Soldier
 The Butcher
 The Conformist
 Gods of the Plague
 Mujo
 Tora! Tora! Tora!
 Valerie and Her Week of Wonders

1971
 Beware of a Holy Whore
 A Clockwork Orange
 Love
 The Song of the Blood-Red Flower

1972
 Across 110th Street
 Aguirre, the Wrath of God
 The Bitter Tears of Petra von Kant
 The Final Comedown
 The Goalkeeper's Fear of the Penalty
 The Godfather
 Last Tango in Paris
 Solaris

1973
 Adiós, Alejandra, Andrea
 Amarcord
 The Exorcist
 The Homecoming
 Serpico

1974
 Ali: Fear Eats the Soul
 The Clockmaker
 The Godfather Part II
 The Night Porter
 Sweet Movie
 Vase de Noces
 A Woman Under the Influence

1975
 Barry Lyndon
 Das Erdbeben in Chili
 Evrydiki BA 2O37
 Jeanne Dielman, 23 quai du Commerce, 1080 Bruxelles
 The Mirror
 Nashville
 One Flew Over the Cuckoo's Nest
 Picnic at Hanging Rock
 Salò, or the 120 Days of Sodom
 Unter dem Pflaster ist der Strand
 A Woman's Decision

1976
 1900
 All the President's Men
 In the Realm of the Senses
 The Killing of a Chinese Bookie
 Man of Marble
 Midway
 Rocky
 Taxi Driver

1977
 3 Women
 The Ascent
 Hitler: A Film from Germany
 The Last Wave
 Opening Night
 The Report
 Saturday Night Fever
 Unsichtbare Gegner
 The Year of the Hare

1978
 Ice Castles
 Interiors
 Killer of Sheep
 You Are Not Alone
 Das zweite Erwachen der Christa Klages

1979
 Hathiar
 The Marriage of Maria Braun
 Norma Rae
 Sisters, or the Balance of Happiness
 Stalker
 The Wretches Are Still Singing

References

Drama
1970s